Shahrukh Khan Ki Maut (Death of Shahrukh Khan) is a Pakistani short film directed and written by Ehteshamuddin and produced by Arjumand Rahim under the production banner of her company Natasha D'souza. It was aired in 2005. It stars Saife Hassan, Tabraiz Shah, Sajid Shah, Aqeel Ahmed, Mehmood Bhatti, Sajid Rafi, Saleem Mairaj, Rashid Farooqi, Sara Umer, Yahya Rashdi, Imran Ali, Shaheer, Shoaib Khan and Arif Khan. The film is based on the life of Murad and his sister and Murad's accidental death.

Cast 
 Saife Hassan as Shamshad
 Tabraiz Shah as Murad
 Sajid Shah as Hair Dresser
 Aqeel Ahmed as James (Bond)
 Mehmood Bhatti as Constable Ali
 Sajid Rafi as Murad's father
 Rashid Farooqi as Ustad Manzoor
 Sara Umer as Murad's sister
 Yahya Rashdi as Mehmood
 Imran Ali as Salesman (Video Shop)
 Shaheer as Saleem
 Shoaib Khan as Akhbar Wala
 Arif Khan as Arif bhai

References 

Pakistani short films
Pakistani television films
2005 films